The Women's singles table tennis event at the 2014 Commonwealth Games was held from 29 July to 1 August at the Scotstoun Sports Campus in Glasgow.

Group stage

Pool A

Pool B

Pool C

Pool D

Pool E

Pool F

Pool G

Pool H

Pool I

Pool J

Pool K

Pool L

Pool N

Pool O

Pool P

Pool Q

Pool R

Pool S

Pool U

Pool V

Pool W

Pool X

Pool Z

Knockout stage

Top Half

Section 1

Section 2

Bottom Half

Section 1

Section 2

Finals

References

Table tennis at the 2014 Commonwealth Games
Common